During the 1997–98 English football season, Southampton Football Club competed in the FA Premier League.

Season summary
Under the management of Dave Jones, with no managerial experience beyond Division Two, Southampton were most people's favourites for relegation to Division One. After all, they had endured close brushes with relegation on no less than five occasions in the previous seven seasons, and most of the club's new signings were drafted in from the lower leagues.

But the Saints were more convincing than they had been in a long time, and most bookmakers had stopped placing bets on them being relegated before Christmas. In the end, a 12th-place finish gave the players and fans alike something to be proud of.

Final league table

Results summary

Results by round

Results
Southampton's score comes first

Legend

FA Premier League

FA Cup

League Cup

Squad

Left club during season

Reserve squad

Transfers

In

Out

Transfers in:  £7,050,000
Transfers out:  £4,650,000
Total spending:  £2,400,000

References

Southampton F.C. seasons
Southampton